Mormonism is the religious tradition and theology of the Latter Day Saint movement of Restorationist Christianity started by Joseph Smith in Western New York in the 1820s and 1830s. As a label, Mormonism has been applied to various aspects of the Latter Day Saint movement, although there has been a recent push from the Church of Jesus Christ of Latter-day Saints (LDS Church) to distance themselves from this label. A historian, Sydney E. Ahlstrom, wrote in 1982, "One cannot even be sure, whether [Mormonism] is a sect, a mystery cult, a new religion, a church, a people, a nation, or an American subculture; indeed, at different times and places it is all of these." However, scholars and theologians within the Latter Day Saint movement, including Smith, have often used "Mormonism" to describe the unique teachings and doctrines of the movement.

A prominent feature of Mormon theology is the Book of Mormon, which describes itself as a chronicle of early Indigenous peoples of the Americas and their dealings with God. Mormon theology includes mainstream Christian beliefs with modifications stemming from belief in revelations to Smith and other religious leaders. This includes the use of and belief in the Bible and other religious texts, including the Doctrine and Covenants and the Pearl of Great Price. Mormonism includes significant doctrines of eternal marriage, eternal progression, baptism for the dead, polygamy or plural marriage, sexual purity, health (specified in the Word of Wisdom), fasting, and Sabbath observance.

The theology itself is not uniform; as early as 1831, and most significantly after Smith's death, various groups split from the Church of Christ that Smith established. Other than differences in leadership, these groups most significantly differ in their stances on polygamy, which the Utah-based LDS Church banned in 1890, and Trinitarianism, which the LDS Church does not affirm. The branch of theology which seeks to maintain the practice of polygamy is known as Mormon fundamentalism and includes several different churches. Other groups affirm Trinitarianism, such as the Community of Christ (formerly the Reorganized Church of Jesus Christ of Latter Day Saints), and describe their doctrine as Trinitarian Christian restorationist.

Cultural Mormonism is a term coined by cultural Mormons who identify with the culture, especially present in much of the American Southwest, but do not necessarily identify with the theology.

Historical overview

The doctrines of Mormonism began with the farmboy Joseph Smith in the 1820s in Western New York during a period of religious excitement which is known as the Second Great Awakening. After praying about which denomination he should join, Smith said he received a vision in the spring of 1820. Called the "First Vision", Smith said that God the Father and his son Jesus Christ appeared to him and instructed him to join none of the existing churches because they were all wrong. During the 1820s Smith chronicled several angelic visitations, and was eventually told that God would use him to re-establish the true Christian church.

Joseph Smith said the Book of Mormon was translated from writing on golden plates in a reformed Egyptian language, translated with the assistance of the Urim and Thummim and seer stones. He said an angel first showed him the location of the plates in 1823, buried in a nearby hill. With the assistance of Martin Harris, an early follower, Smith began dictating the text of the Book of Mormon on April 12, 1828. Although translation was interrupted by persecution, Smith's continued employment in order to support his family, and Harris's loss of 116 pages, the Book of Mormon manuscript was finished in June 1829. Smith said the plates were returned to the angel after he finished the translation. During the time Smith said he possessed the plates, 15 people were allowed to witness their existence.

The Book of Mormon claims to be a chronicle of early Israelites who left the Near East and traveled to the Americas. The book begins  BC with the departure from Jerusalem of the family of the prophet Lehi at the urging of God, and their sailing  BC to the Americas. It records the people of the Americas as having had a belief in Christ hundreds of years before his birth, their witnessing his personal visitation to them after his resurrection, and eventually losing Christianity after generations of wars and apostasy. The Book of Mormon and continuing revelations would be the means of establishing correct doctrine for the restored church. Smith, Oliver Cowdery, and other early followers began baptizing new converts in 1829 and formally organized in 1830 as the Church of Christ. Smith was seen by his followers as a modern-day prophet.

Historical accuracy and veracity of the Book of Mormon was, at the time of its publication and continuing to the present day, hotly contested. Along with disputes over the Book of Mormon, the early Church of Christ faced persecution from residents of several towns where they tried to gather and "establish God's kingdom on the earth". To avoid confrontation in Palmyra, New York the members moved to Kirtland, Ohio, and hoped to establish a permanent New Jerusalem or City of Zion in Jackson County, Missouri. However, they were expelled from Jackson County in 1833 and fled to other parts of Missouri in 1838. Violence between the Missourians and church members resulted in the governor of Missouri issuing an "extermination order" against the Mormons, as they were called, which again forced the church to relocate. The displaced church fled to Illinois, to a small town called Commerce. Under Smith's direction, the church bought the town, renamed it Nauvoo, and lived with a degree of peace and prosperity for a few years. However, tensions between Mormons and their neighbors again escalated and in 1844 Smith was killed by a mob, precipitating a succession crisis.

The largest group of Mormons accepted Brigham Young as the new prophet and, under his direction, emigrated to what became the Utah Territory. There, the church began the open practice of plural marriage, a form of polygyny which Smith had instituted in Nauvoo. Plural marriage became the faith's most sensational characteristic during the 19th century, but vigorous opposition by the United States Congress threatened the church's existence as a legal institution. Further, polygamy was also a major cause for the opposition to Mormonism in the states of Idaho and Arizona. In the 1890 Manifesto, church president Wilford Woodruff announced the official end of plural marriage.

Due to this formal abolition of plural marriage, several smaller groups broke with the LDS Church and formed denominations following what they called Mormon fundamentalism. However, the LDS Church has experienced the most growth out of any of the churches following Mormonism, with a current membership of over 16 million.

Theology

Nature of God

In orthodox Mormonism, the term God generally refers to the biblical God the Father, whom Latter Day Saints refer to as Elohim, and the term Godhead refers to a council of three distinct divine persons consisting of God the Father, Jesus Christ (his firstborn Son, whom Latter Day Saints refer to as Jehovah), and the Holy Ghost. Latter Day Saints believe that the Father, Son, and Holy Ghost are three distinct beings, and that the Father and Jesus have perfected, glorified, physical bodies, while the Holy Ghost is a spirit without a physical body. Latter Day Saints also believe that there are other gods and goddesses outside the Godhead, such as a Heavenly Mother—who is the wife of God the Father—and that faithful Latter-day Saints may attain godhood in the afterlife. Joseph Smith taught that God was once a man on another planet before being exalted to Godhood.

This conception differs from the traditional Christian Trinity in several ways, one of which is that Mormonism has not adopted or continued to hold the doctrine of the Nicene Creed, that the Father, Son, and Holy Ghost are of the same substance or being. Also, Mormonism teaches that the intelligence dwelling in each human is coeternal with God. Mormons use the term omnipotent to describe God, and regard him as the creator: they understand him as being almighty and eternal but subject to eternal natural law which governs intelligences, justice and the eternal nature of matter (i.e. God organized the world but did not create it from nothing). The Mormon conception of God also differs substantially from the Jewish tradition of ethical monotheism in which elohim is a completely different conception.

This description of God represents the Mormon orthodoxy, formalized in 1915 based on earlier teachings. Other currently existing and historical branches of Mormonism have adopted different views of god, such as the Adam–God doctrine and Trinitarianism.

Restoration

Mormonism describes itself as falling within world Christianity, but as a distinct restored dispensation; it characterizes itself as the only true form of the Christian religion since the time of a "Great Apostasy" that began not long after the ascension of Jesus Christ. According to Mormons this apostasy involved the corruption of the pure, original Christian doctrine with Greek and other philosophies, and followers dividing into different ideological groups. Additionally, Mormons claim the martyrdom of the Apostles led to the loss of Priesthood authority to administer the Church and its ordinances.

Mormons believe that God re-established the 1st-century early Christian church as found in the New Testament through the restoration of Joseph Smith. In particular, Mormons believe that angels such as Peter, James, John, and John the Baptist appeared to Joseph Smith and others and bestowed various Priesthood authorities on them. Mormons thus believe that their Church is the "only true and living church" because divine authority was restored to it through Smith. In addition, Mormons believe that Smith and his legitimate successors are modern prophets who receive revelation from God to guide the church. They maintain that other religions have a portion of the truth and are guided by the light of Christ.

Cosmology

Smith's cosmology is laid out mostly in Smith's later revelations and sermons, but particularly the Book of Abraham, the Book of Moses, and the King Follett discourse. Mormon cosmology presents a unique view of God and the universe, and places a high importance on human agency. In Mormonism, life on earth is just a short part of an eternal existence. Mormons believe that in the beginning, all people existed as spirits or "intelligences," in the presence of God. In this state, God proposed a plan of salvation whereby they could progress and "have a privilege to advance like himself." The spirits were free to accept or reject this plan, and a "third" of them, led by Satan rejected it. The rest accepted the plan, coming to earth and receiving bodies with an understanding that they would experience sin and suffering.

In Mormonism, the central part of God's plan is the atonement of Jesus Christ. Mormons believe that one purpose of earthly life is to learn to choose good over evil. In this process, people inevitably make mistakes, becoming unworthy to return to the presence of God. Mormons believe that Jesus paid for the sins of the world and that all people can be saved through his atonement. Mormons accept Christ's atonement through faith, repentance, formal covenants or ordinances such as baptism, and consistently trying to live a Christ-like life.

According to Mormon scripture, the Earth's creation was not ex nihilo, but organized from existing matter. The Earth is just one of many inhabited worlds, and there are many governing heavenly bodies, including the planet or star Kolob, which is said to be nearest the throne of God.

America

Mormon theology teaches that the United States is a unique place and that Mormons are God's chosen people, selected for a singular destiny. The Book of Mormon alludes to the United States as being the Biblical promised land, with the Constitution of the United States being divinely inspired, and argues that America is an exceptional nation.

In Upstate New York in 1823, Joseph Smith claimed to have had a vision in which the Angel Moroni told him about engraved golden plates buried in a nearby hill. According to Smith, he received subsequent instruction from Moroni and, four years later, excavated the plates and translated them from "reformed Egyptian" into English; the resultant Book of Mormon—so called after an ancient American prophet who, according to Smith, had compiled the text recorded on the golden plates—recounts the history of a tribe of Israelites, led by the prophet Lehi, who migrated from Jerusalem to the Americas in the 7th century BCE. In Mormonism, these Israelite tribes who migrated to the Americas centuries before the birth of Jesus Christ are considered to be among the ancestors of pre-Columbian Native Americans.

Joseph Smith argued that the millennial New Jerusalem was to be built in America (10th Article of Faith). In the Doctrine and Covenants, Smith records God as saying "it is not right that any man should be in bondage one to another. And for this purpose have I established the Constitution of this land, by the hands of wise men whom I raised up unto this very purpose, and redeemed the land by the shedding of blood" (D&C 101:79–80). To Mormons, this places America as the originator of religious liberty and freedom, while noting a need to expand these American values worldwide.

Although officially shunned by the LDS Church, fundamentalist Mormons believe in the White Horse Prophecy, which argues that Mormons will be called upon to preserve the Constitution as it hangs "by a thread".

Ordinances
In Mormonism, an ordinance is a religious ritual of special significance, often involving the formation of a covenant with God. Ordinances are performed by the authority of the priesthood and in the name of Jesus Christ. The term has a meaning roughly similar to that of the term sacrament in other Christian denominations.

Saving ordinances (or ordinances viewed as necessary for salvation) include: baptism by immersion after the age of accountability (normally age 8); confirmation and reception of the gift of the Holy Ghost, performed by laying hands on the head of a newly baptized member; ordination to the Aaronic and Melchizedek priesthoods for males; an endowment (including washing and anointing) received in temples; and marriage (or sealing) to a spouse.

Mormons also perform other ordinances, which include the Lord's supper (commonly called the sacrament), naming and blessing children, giving priesthood blessings and patriarchal blessings, anointing and blessing the sick, participating in prayer circles, and setting apart individuals who are called to church positions.

In Mormonism, the saving ordinances are seen as necessary for salvation, but they are not sufficient in and of themselves. For example, baptism is required for exaltation, but simply having been baptized does not guarantee any eternal reward. The baptized person is expected to be obedient to God's commandments, to repent of any sinful conduct subsequent to baptism, and to receive the other saving ordinances.

Because Mormons believe that everyone must receive certain ordinances to be saved, Mormons perform ordinances on behalf of deceased persons. These ordinances are performed vicariously or by "proxy" on behalf of the dead. In accordance with their belief in each individual's "free agency", living or dead, Mormons believe that the deceased may accept or reject the offered ordinance in the spirit world, just as all spirits decided to accept or reject God's plan originally. In addition, these "conditional" ordinances on behalf of the dead are performed only when a deceased person's genealogical information has been submitted to a temple and correctly processed there before the ordinance ritual is performed. Only ordinances for salvation are performed on behalf of deceased persons.

Scripture

Mormons believe in the Old and New Testaments, and the LDS Church uses the Authorized King James Version as its official scriptural text of the Bible. While Mormons believe in the general accuracy of the modern day text of the Bible, they also believe that it is incomplete and that errors have been introduced. In Mormon theology, many lost truths are restored in the Book of Mormon, which Mormons hold to be divine scripture and equal in authority to the Bible.

The Mormon scriptural canon also includes a collection of revelations and writings contained in the Doctrine and Covenants which contains doctrine and prophecy and the Pearl of Great Price which addresses briefly Genesis to Exodus. These books, as well as the Joseph Smith Translation of the Bible, have varying degrees of acceptance as divine scripture among different denominations of the Latter Day Saint movement.

Revelation

In Mormonism, continuous revelation is the principle that God or his divine agents still continue to communicate to mankind. This communication can be manifest in many ways: influences of the Holy Ghost (the principal form in which this principle is manifest), visions, visitations of divine beings, and others. Joseph Smith used the example of the Lord's revelations to Moses in Deuteronomy to explain the importance of continuous revelation:

Mormons believe that Smith and subsequent church leaders could speak scripture "when moved upon by the Holy Ghost." In addition, many Mormons believe that ancient prophets in other regions of the world received revelations that resulted in additional scriptures that have been lost and may, one day, be forthcoming. In Mormonism, revelation is not limited to church members. For instance, Latter Day Saints believe that the United States Constitution is a divinely inspired document.

Mormons are encouraged to develop a personal relationship with the Holy Ghost and receive personal revelation for their own direction and that of their family. The Latter Day Saint concept of revelation includes the belief that revelation from God is available to all those who earnestly seek it with the intent of doing good. It also teaches that everyone is entitled to  revelation with respect to his or her stewardship (leadership responsibility). Thus, parents may receive inspiration from God in raising their families, individuals can receive divine inspiration to help them meet personal challenges, church officers may receive revelation for those whom they serve.

The important consequence of this is that each person may receive confirmation that particular doctrines taught by a prophet are true, as well as gain divine insight in using those truths for their own benefit and eternal progress. In the church, personal revelation is expected and encouraged, and many converts believe that personal revelation from God was instrumental in their conversion.

Relationship with other faiths

Relationship with mainstream Christianity

Mormonism categorizes itself within Christianity, and nearly all Mormons self-identify as Christian. For some who define Christianity within the doctrines of Catholicism, Eastern and Oriental Orthodoxy, the Churches of the East, and Protestantism, Mormonism's differences place it outside the umbrella of Christianity.

Since its beginnings, the faith has proclaimed itself to be Christ's Church restored with its original authority, structure and power; maintaining that existing denominations believed in incorrect doctrines and were not acknowledged by God as his church and kingdom. Though the religion quickly gained a large following of Christian seekers, in the 1830s, many American Christians came to view the church's early doctrines and practices as politically and culturally subversive, as well as doctrinally heretical, abominable, and condemnable. This discord led to a series of sometimes-deadly conflicts between Mormons and others who saw themselves as orthodox Christians. Although such violence declined during the twentieth century, the religion's unique doctrinal views and practices still generate criticism, sometimes vehemently so. This gives rise to efforts by Mormons and opposing types of Christians to proselytize each other.

Mormons believe in Jesus Christ as the literal Son of God and Messiah, his crucifixion as a conclusion of a sin offering, and subsequent resurrection. However, Latter-day Saints (LDS) reject the ecumenical creeds and the definition of the Trinity. (In contrast, the second-largest Latter Day Saint denomination, the Community of Christ, is Trinitarian and monotheistic.) Mormons hold the view that the New Testament prophesied both the apostasy from the teachings of Christ and his apostles as well as the restoration of all things prior to the second coming of Christ.

Some notable differences with mainstream Christianity include: A belief that Jesus began his atonement in the garden of Gethsemane and continued it to his crucifixion, rather than the orthodox belief that the crucifixion alone was the physical atonement; and an afterlife with three degrees of glory, with hell (often called spirit prison) being a temporary repository for the wicked between death and the resurrection. Additionally, Mormons do not believe in creation ex nihilo, believing that matter is eternal, and creation involved God organizing existing matter.

Much of the Mormon belief system is geographically oriented around the North and South American continents. Mormons believe that the people of the Book of Mormon lived in the western hemisphere, that Christ appeared in the western hemisphere after his death and resurrection, that the true faith was restored in Upstate New York by Joseph Smith, that the Garden of Eden was located in North America, and that the New Jerusalem would be built in Missouri. For this and other reasons, including a belief by many Mormons in American exceptionalism, Molly Worthen speculates that this may be why Leo Tolstoy described Mormonism as the "quintessential 'American religion.

Relationship with Judaism

Although Mormons do not claim to be part of Judaism, Mormon theology claims to situate Mormonism within the context of Judaism to an extent that goes beyond what most other Christian denominations claim. The faith incorporates many Old Testament ideas into its theology, and the beliefs of Mormons sometimes parallel those of Judaism and certain elements of Jewish culture. In the earliest days of Mormonism, Joseph Smith taught that the Indigenous peoples of the Americas were members of some of the Lost Tribes of Israel. Later, he taught that Mormons were Israelites, and that they may learn of their tribal affiliation within the twelve Israelite tribes. Members of the LDS Church receive Patriarchal blessings which declare the recipient's lineage within one of the tribes of Israel. The lineage is either through true blood-line or adoption. The LDS Church teaches that if one is not a direct descendant of one of the twelve tribes, upon baptism he or she is adopted into one of the tribes. Patriarchal blessings also include personal information which is revealed through a patriarch by the power of the priesthood.

The Mormon affinity for Judaism is expressed by the many references to Judaism in the Mormon liturgy. For example, Smith named the largest Mormon settlement he founded Nauvoo, which means "to be beautiful" in Hebrew. Brigham Young named a tributary of the Great Salt Lake the Jordan River. The LDS Church created a writing scheme called the Deseret Alphabet, which was based, in part, on Hebrew. The LDS Church has a Jerusalem Center in Israel, where students focus their study on Near Eastern history, culture, language, and the Bible.

There has been some controversy involving Jewish groups who see the actions of some elements of Mormonism as offensive. In the 1990s, Jewish groups vocally opposed the LDS practice of baptism for the dead on behalf of Jewish victims of the Holocaust and Jews in general. According to LDS Church general authority Monte J. Brough, "Mormons who baptized 380,000 Holocaust victims posthumously were motivated by love and compassion and did not understand their gesture might offend Jews ... they did not realize that what they intended as a 'Christian act of service' was 'misguided and insensitive. Mormons believe that when the dead are baptized through proxy, they have the option of accepting or rejecting the ordinance.

Relationship with Islam

Since its origins in the 19th century, Mormonism has been compared to Islam, often by detractors of one religion or the other. For instance, Joseph Smith was referred to as "the modern  by the New York Herald, shortly after his murder in June 1844. This epithet repeated a comparison that had been made from Smith's earliest career, one that was not intended at the time to be complimentary. Comparison of the Mormon and Muslim prophets still occurs today, sometimes for derogatory or polemical reasons but also for more scholarly (and neutral) purposes. While Mormonism and Islam have many similarities, there are also significant, fundamental differences between the two religions. Mormon–Muslim relations have been historically cordial; recent years have seen increasing dialogue between adherents of the two faiths, and cooperation in charitable endeavors, especially in the Middle and Far East.

Islam and Mormonism both originate in the Abrahamic traditions. Each religion sees its founder (Muhammad for Islam, and Joseph Smith for Mormonism) as being a true prophet of God, called to re-establish the truths of these ancient theological belief systems that have been altered, corrupted, or lost. In addition, both prophets received visits from an angel, leading to additional books of scripture. Both religions share a high emphasis on family life, charitable giving, chastity, abstention from alcohol, and a special reverence for, though not worship of, their founding prophet. Before the 1890 Manifesto against plural marriage, Mormonism and Islam also shared in the belief in and practice of plural marriage, a practice now held in common by Islam and various branches of Mormon fundamentalism.

The religions differ significantly in their views on God. Islam insists upon the complete oneness and uniqueness of God (Allah), while Mormonism asserts that the Godhead is made up of three distinct "personages."
Mormonism sees Jesus Christ as the promised Messiah and the literal Son of God, while Islam insists that the title "Messiah" means that Jesus (or "Isa") was a prophet sent to establish the true faith, not that he was the Son of God or a divine being. Despite opposition from other Christian denominations, Mormonism identifies itself as a Christian religion, the "restoration" of primitive Christianity. Islam does not refer to itself as "Christian", asserting that Jesus and all true followers of Christ's teachings were (and are) Muslims—a term that means submitters to God. Islam proclaims that its prophet Muhammad was the "seal of the prophets", and that no further prophets would come after him. Mormons, though honoring Joseph Smith as the first prophet in modern times, see him as just one in a long line of prophets, with Jesus Christ being the premier figure of the religion. For these and many other reasons, group membership is generally mutually exclusive: both religious groups would agree that a person cannot be both Mormon and Muslim.

Theological divisions
Mormon theology includes three main movements. By far the largest of these is "mainstream Mormonism", defined by the leadership of the Church of Jesus Christ of Latter-day Saints (LDS Church). The two broad movements outside mainstream Mormonism are Mormon fundamentalism, and liberal reformist Mormonism.

Mainstream Mormon theology

Mainstream Mormonism is defined by the leadership of the LDS Church which identifies itself as Christian. Members of the LDS Church consider their top leaders to be prophets and apostles, and are encouraged to accept their positions on matters of theology, while seeking confirmation of them through personal study of the Book of Mormon and the Bible. Personal prayer is encouraged as well. The LDS Church is by far the largest branch of Mormonism. It has continuously existed since the succession crisis of 1844 that split the Latter Day Saint movement after the death of founder Joseph Smith, Jr.

The LDS Church seeks to distance itself from other branches of Mormonism, particularly those that practice polygamy.
The church maintains a degree of orthodoxy by excommunicating or disciplining its members who take positions or engage in practices viewed as apostasy. For example, the LDS Church excommunicates members who practice polygamy or who adopt the beliefs and practices of Mormon fundamentalism.

Mormon fundamentalism

One way Mormon fundamentalism distinguishes itself from mainstream Mormonism is through the practice of plural marriage. Fundamentalists initially broke from the LDS Church after that doctrine was discontinued around the beginning of the 20th century. Mormon fundamentalism teaches that plural marriage is a requirement for exaltation (the highest degree of salvation), which will allow them to live as gods and goddesses in the afterlife. Mainstream Mormons, by contrast, believe that a single Celestial marriage is necessary for exaltation.

In distinction with the LDS Church, Mormon fundamentalists also often believe in a number of other doctrines taught and practiced by Brigham Young in the 19th century, which the LDS Church has either abandoned, repudiated, or put in abeyance. These include:
the law of consecration also known as the United Order (put in abeyance by the LDS Church in the 19th century);
the Adam–God teachings taught by Brigham Young and other early leaders of the LDS Church (repudiated by the LDS Church in the mid-20th century);
the principle of blood atonement (repudiated by the LDS Church in the mid-19th century); and
the exclusion of black men from the priesthood (abandoned by the LDS Church in 1978).

Mormon fundamentalists believe that these principles were wrongly abandoned or changed by the LDS Church, in large part due to the desire of its leadership and members to assimilate into mainstream American society and avoid the persecutions and conflict that had characterized the church throughout its early years. Others believe that it was a necessity at some point for "a restoration of all things" to be a truly restored Church.

Liberal reformist theology

Some LDS Church members have worked towards a more liberal reform of the church. Others have left the LDS Church and still consider themselves to be cultural Mormons. Others have formed new religions (many of them now defunct). For instance the Godbeites broke away from the LDS Church in the late 19th century, on the basis of both political and religious liberalism, and in 1985 the Restoration Church of Jesus Christ broke away from the LDS Church as an LGBT-friendly denomination, which was formally dissolved in 2010.

Criticism

As the largest denomination within Mormonism, the LDS Church has been the subject of criticism since it was founded by Joseph Smith in 1830.

Perhaps the most controversial, and a key contributing factor for Smith's murder, is the claim that plural marriage (as defenders call it) or polygamy (as critics call it) is biblically authorized. Under heavy pressure—Utah would not be accepted as a state if polygamy was practiced—the church formally and publicly renounced the practice in 1890. Utah's statehood soon followed. However, plural marriage remains a controversial and divisive issue, as despite the official renunciation of 1890, it still has sympathizers, defenders, and semi-secret practitioners within Mormonism, though not within the LDS Church.

More recent criticism has focused on questions of historical revisionism, homophobia, racism, sexist policies, inadequate financial disclosure, and the historical authenticity of the Book of Mormon.

See also

 Anti-Mormonism
 Black people and Mormonism
 Black people and early Mormonism
 Black people and Mormon priesthood
 Encyclopedia of Mormonism
 List of articles about Mormonism
 List of denominations in the Latter Day Saint movement
 Mormonism and Pacific Islanders
 Native American people and Mormonism
 Outline of Joseph Smith
 Outline of the Book of Mormon
 The Joseph Smith Papers

References

Citations

Cited and general sources
.
.
.
.
.
.
.
.
.
.
.
.
.
.
.
.

Further reading
 Beckwith, Francis J., Carl Mosser, and Paul Owen, jt. eds. (2002). The New Mormon Challenge: Responding to the Latest Defenses of a Fast-Growing Movement. Grand Rapids, Mich.: Zondervan. 535 p. 
 Brooks, Melvin R. (1960). L.D.S. Reference Encyclopedia. Salt Lake City, Utah: Bookcraft.
 
 McConkie, Bruce R. (1979). Mormon Doctrine. Second ed. Salt Lake City, Utah: Bookcraft. 856 p. N.B.: The contents are brief articles arranged alphabetically in the form of a topical dictionary. 
 Nelson, Nels L. (1904). Scientific Aspects of Mormonism: or, Religion in Terms of Life. Chicago, Ill.: Press of Hillison & Etten Co., 1904, t.p. 1918. xi, 347 p.
 Shields, Steven L. (1990). Divergent Paths of the Restoration: a History of the Latter Day Saint Movement. Fourth ed., rev. and enl. Los Angeles: Restoration Research. 336 p., ill. with b&w photos.

External links

PBS: Frontline + American Experience: Mormons—PBS special on Mormon belief
Patheos + Mormonism—Patheos.com. Mormonism Origins, Mormonism History, Mormonism Beliefs
"Religions: Mormonism"—BBC Religion

Links to official websites of specific Mormon denominations
The Church of Jesus Christ of Latter-day Saints
Community of Christ (Formerly the RLDS church)
The Church of Jesus Christ (Bickertonite)
Church of Christ With the Elijah Message

 
Christian new religious movements
Joseph Smith
Latter Day Saint terms
Mormon studies
Nontrinitarian denominations
Abrahamic religions
1820s introductions